Marylebone Cricket Club organised the England cricket team's tour of Australia in the 1924–25 season.  Australia won the Ashes series 4–1.

Test series summary

First Test

The first Test included a record 127 run tenth wicket partnership between Johnny Taylor and Arthur Mailey which stood as Australia's best for that wicket until Phillip Hughes and Ashton Agar set a new world record by scoring 163 for the tenth wicket against England in the First Test at Trent Bridge in July 2013.

Second Test

Third Test

Fourth Test

Fifth Test

Ceylon
The English team had a stopover in Colombo en route to Australia and played a one-day single-innings match there against the Ceylon national team, which at that time did not have Test status.

References

Further reading
 Bill Frindall, The Wisden Book of Test Cricket 1877–1978, Wisden, 1979
 Chris Harte, A History of Australian Cricket, Andre Deutsch, 1993
 Ray Robinson, On Top Down Under, Cassell, 1975
 Wisden Cricketers' Almanack 1926

1924 in English cricket
1924 in Australian cricket
1924 in Ceylon
1925 in English cricket
1925 in Australian cricket
1924-25
1924
Australian cricket seasons from 1918–19 to 1944–45
International cricket competitions from 1918–19 to 1945
Sri Lankan cricket seasons from 1880–81 to 1971–72
1924-25